Jean Papineau-Couture,  (November 12, 1916August 11, 2000) was a Canadian composer and academic.

Born in Montreal, Papineau-Couture is the grandson of conductor and composer Guillaume Couture. As a child he studied piano with his mother. He first studied privately in Montreal with Gabriel Cusson before entering the Collège Jean-de-Brébeuf where he received a Bachelor of Arts in 1937. He then attended the New England Conservatory of Music in Boston where he received a Bachelor of Music in 1941. He studied with Nadia Boulanger at the Longy School of Music in Cambridge, Massachusetts.

Returning to Quebec, Papineau-Couture's teaching career started in 1946 when he joined the faculty of the Conservatoire de musique du Québec à Montréal where he stayed until 1962. He also taught in the Faculty of Music at the Université de Montréal. He was named vice-dean in 1967 and dean from 1968 until 1973. His students included François Morel, Pierre Rolland, and Jeannine Vanier.

In 1962 Papineau-Couture was awarded the Calixa-Lavallée Award. In 1968, he was made an Officer of the Order of Canada and was promoted to Companion in 1993. In 1989, he was made a Grand Officer of the National Order of Quebec. Papineau-Couture received the Governor General's Performing Arts Award for Lifetime Artistic Achievement in 1994 for his contribution to classical music.

References

External links

Jean Papineau-Couture at The Canadian Encyclopedia

20th-century Canadian composers
1916 births
2000 deaths
Academics from Montreal
Canadian male composers
Canadian music academics
Canadian university and college faculty deans
Companions of the Order of Canada
Academic staff of the Conservatoire de musique du Québec à Montréal
Governor General's Performing Arts Award winners
Grand Officers of the National Order of Quebec
Longy School of Music of Bard College alumni
Musicians from Montreal
Burials at Notre Dame des Neiges Cemetery
Prix Denise-Pelletier winners
Academic staff of the Université de Montréal
20th-century musicologists
20th-century Canadian male musicians
Canadian expatriates in the United States